Enrique Cardenas (born August 5, 1991) is an American soccer player who plays as a midfielder for the Los Angeles Force in the National Independent Soccer Association.

Career

College & Amateur
Cardenas played five years of college soccer at UC Irvine between 2009 and 2013, including a red-shirted year in 2009. During his time at college, Cardenas was named First Team All-West Region, Big West Midfielder of the Year and First Team All-Big West in 2013.

While at college, Cardenas appeared for USL PDL clubs Orange County Blue Star in 2012 and OC Blues Strikers and Los Angeles Misioneros in 2013.

Professional career
After going undrafted in the 2014 MLS SuperDraft, Cardenas signed with USL Pro club Orange County Blues on April 4, 2014. He is of Mexican American descent.

References

External links
LA Force bio

1991 births
Living people
American soccer players
American sportspeople of Mexican descent
UC Irvine Anteaters men's soccer players
Orange County Blue Star players
OC Pateadores Blues players
LA Laguna FC players
Orange County SC players
Kitsap Pumas players
FC Golden State Force players
Association football midfielders
Soccer players from California
USL League Two players
People from Indio, California
Sportspeople from Riverside County, California
Orange County SC U-23 players
Los Angeles Force players